Sleeping while on duty or sleeping on the job –  falling asleep while one is not supposed to – is considered gross misconduct and grounds for disciplinary action, including termination of employment, in some occupations. Recently however, there has been a movement in support of sleeping, or napping at work, with scientific studies highlighting health and productivity benefits, and over 6% of employers in some countries providing facilities to do so. In some types of work, such as firefighting or live-in caregiving, sleeping at least part of the shift may be an expected part of paid work time. While some employees who sleep while on duty in violation do so intentionally and hope not to get caught, others intend in good faith to stay awake, and accidentally doze.

Sleeping while on duty is such an important issue that it is addressed in the employee handbook in some workplaces. Concerns that employers have may include the lack of productivity, the unprofessional appearance, and danger that may occur when the employee's duties involve watching to prevent a hazardous situation. In some occupations, such as pilots, truck and bus drivers, or those operating heavy machinery, falling asleep while on duty puts lives in danger. However, in many countries, these workers are supposed to take a break and rest every few hours.

Frequency
The frequency of sleeping while on duty that occurs varies depending on the time of day. Daytime employees are more likely to take short naps, while graveyard shift workers have a higher likelihood of sleeping for a large portion of their shift, sometimes intentionally.

A survey by the National Sleep Foundation has found that 30% of participants have admitted to sleeping while on duty. More than 90% of Americans have experienced a problem at work because of a poor night's sleep. One in four admit to shirking duties on the job for the same reason, either calling in sick or napping during work hours.

Views
Employers have varying views of sleeping while on duty. Some companies have instituted policies to allow employees to take napping breaks during the workday in order to improve productivity while others are strict when dealing with employees who sleep while on duty and use high-tech means, such as video surveillance, to catch their employees who may be sleeping on the job. Those who are caught in violation may face disciplinary action such as suspension or firing.

Some employees sleep, nap, or take a power-nap only during their allotted break time at work. This may or may not be permitted, depending on the employer's policies. Some employers may prohibit sleeping, even during unpaid break time, for various reasons, such as the unprofessional appearance of a sleeping employee, the need for an employee to be available during an emergency, or legal regulations. Employees who may endanger others by sleeping on the job may face more serious consequences, such as legal sanctions. For example, airline pilots risk loss of their licenses.

In some industries and work cultures sleeping at work is permitted and even encouraged. Such work cultures typically have flexible schedules, and variant work loads with extremely demanding periods where employees feel unable to spend time commuting. In such environments it is common for employers to provide makeshift sleeping materials for employees, such as a couch and/or inflatable mattress and blankets. This practice is particularly common in start-ups and during political campaigns. In those work cultures sleeping in the office is seen as evidence of dedication.
 
In 1968, New York police officers admitted that sleeping while on duty was customary.

In Japan, the practice of napping in public, called , may occur in work meetings or classes. Brigitte Steger, a scholar who focuses on Japanese culture, writes that sleeping at work is considered a sign of dedication to the job, such that one has stayed up late doing work or worked to the point of complete exhaustion, and may therefore be excusable.

Notable incidents

Airline pilots
 February 2008 – the pilots on a Go! airline flight were suspended during an investigation when it was suspected they fell asleep mid-flight from Honolulu, Hawaii to Hilo, Hawaii, resulting in their overshooting Hilo Airport by about 24 kilometers (15 miles) before turning around to land safely.

Air traffic controllers
 October 1984 – Aeroflot Flight 3352 hit maintenance vehicles on the runway while attempting to land in Omsk, Russia. The ground controller, who had been up at nights due to recently becoming a father of two, allowed the workers to dry the runway during heavy rain and fell asleep on the job. 178 people were killed in the crash; the controller later killed himself in prison.
 October 2007 – four Italian air traffic controllers were suspended after they were caught asleep while on duty.
 March 2011 – the lone night shift air traffic controller at Ronald Reagan Washington National Airport fell asleep on duty. During the period he was asleep two airliners landed uneventfully. In the weeks that followed, there were other similar incidents and it was revealed that other lone air traffic controllers on duty fell asleep in the towers. This led to the resignation of United States air traffic chief Hank Krakowski and a new policy being set requiring two controllers to be on duty at all times.

Bus drivers
 March 2011 – a tour bus driver crashed while returning from a casino in Connecticut to New York City. Fifteen people were killed and many others injured. Although the driver, who was found to be sober, denied sleeping, a survivor who witnessed the crash reported that he was speeding and sleeping.

Police officers/security officers
 December 1947 – a Washington, D.C. police officer was fined $75 for sleeping while on duty.
 October 2007 – a CBS news story revealed nearly a dozen security guards at a nuclear power plant who were videotaped sleeping while on duty.
 December 2009 – The New York Post published a photo of a prison guard sleeping next to an inmate at the Rikers Island penitentiary. The photo was allegedly captured on the cell phone camera of another guard. Both guards were disciplined for this action, the sleeping officer for sleeping and the officer who took the photo for violating a prison policy forbidding cell phones while on duty. The inmate was not identified.

Other
 March 1987 – The Peach Bottom Nuclear Generating Station was ordered shut down by the Nuclear Regulatory Commission after four operators were found sleeping while on duty.

See also
 Nap
 Power nap

References

Duty
Grounds for termination of employment
Occupational safety and health